Camelback Mountain Resort is a ski and snowboard resort located in the Tannersville, Pennsylvania in the Pocono Mountains.

Opened in December 1963, Camelback is the largest ski resort in the Poconos. In the 1950s, when developers were working to expand the original solitary ski run, they negotiated with the then Pennsylvania Department of Environmental Resources for permission to use a small portion of the state park for the ski area in exchange for $1 a year and the obligation to maintain the entire park.

Camelback Mountain reaches an elevation of 2,133 feet (650 m). There are 166 acres (67 hectares) of skiing & snowboarding terrain. The resort has a total of 35 slopes; the longest is the Nile Mile, at .88 miles. It features a vertical drop of 800 ft (244 m), two terrain parks, 15 lifts, including 2 high speed detachable chairlifts; the Sullivan Express and Stevenson Express, both quads. The mountain summit receives an average of 50 in (127 cm) of snowfall each winter. It has snowmaking facilities on ski slopes, primarily relying on portable snow guns to create snow, and is 100% lit for night skiing.

In May 2015 Camelback opened Camelback Resort and Indoor Waterpark. Additional attractions was added with Camelback Mountain Adventures, which features multiple ziplines.

Camelback has invested in their educational ski and snowboard programs. The resort uses the marketing phrase: "Learn Here, Learn Right".

Camelback Resort and Indoor Waterpark

Camelback Resort and Indoor Waterpark was opened in 2015. Their waterpark, known as Aquatopia, was voted the #1 Indoor Waterpark in the country by USA Today for 2015. The indoor park is open year-round while the outdoor park is open only in the summer. Aquatopia includes over 37 waterslides (the most in Pennsylvania), including four body slides, a mat slide, five tube slides and four raft rides, in addition to a  wave pool, lazy river, a children's play area, and a full-sized competition pool. Aquatopia also features the FlowRider, a wave riding pool for surfing and boogie boarding.

Camelback Mountain Adventures

Camelback Mountain Adventures offers Treetop Adventure courses,  of zipline,  ZipFlyer, Mountain Segways, Disc Golf, and a 4500' Mountain Coaster. Within Camelback Mountain Adventures, they also offer Adventure Zone activities of Climbing Wall, EuroBungee, and a Freefall Airbag Jump. Soon to be added to Camelback Mountain Adventures is an Alpine Slide. Camelback Mountain Adventures is open from June to November.

The ski trails
 The Birches, an Advanced Novice ski run 
 King Tut, an Intermediate run 
 The Hump, Expert 
 The Asp 
 The Rocket 
 Marje's Delight 
 The Dromedary 
 Big Pocono Run 
 Upper Cleopatra 
 Marc Anthony 
 Julius Caesar 
 Little Caesar 
 Laurel Glade  
 Coolmoor 
 The Meadows 
 John Bailey 
 Sulivan's Trail 
 The Sphinx 
 Honeymoon Lane 
 Home Again 
 Lower Cleopatra 
 Sunbowl 
 Oak Grove 
 Turkey Trot 
 Upper Moore's Ramble 
 Lower Moore's Ramble 
 Pocono Raceway 
 The Pharaoh 
 The Bactrian 
 Cliffhanger 
 Near East 
 The Nile Mile 
 Basilisk

Climate

According to the Trewartha climate classification system, Camelback Mountain Resort has a Temperate Continental climate (Dc) with warm summers (b), cold winters (o) and year-around precipitation (Dcbo). Dcbo climates are characterized by at least one month having an average mean temperature ≤ , four to seven months with an average mean temperature ≥ , all months with an average mean temperature <  and no significant precipitation difference between seasons. Although most summer days are comfortably humid at Camelback Mountain Resort, episodes of heat and high humidity can occur with heat index values > . July is the peak month for thunderstorm activity which correlates with the average warmest month of the year. The wettest month of the year is September which correlates with tropical storm remnants during the peak of the Atlantic hurricane season. Episodes of extreme cold and wind can occur with wind chill values < . The average snowiest month is January which correlates with the average coldest month of the year. Ice storms and large snowstorms depositing ≥  of snow occur nearly every year, particularly during nor’easters from December through March.

Ecology

According to the A. W. Kuchler U.S. potential natural vegetation types, Camelback Mountain Resort would have transient dominant vegetation types of Northern Hardwood (106) and Appalachian Oak (104) with transient dominant vegetation forms of Northern hardwood forest (26) and Eastern Hardwood Forest (25). The peak spring bloom typically occurs in late-April and early-May and peak fall color usually occurs from early-to-mid October.

References

External links
 Camelback Ski Area official website
 Trailmap
 Conditions

Pocono Mountains
Ski areas and resorts in Pennsylvania
1963 establishments in Pennsylvania
Buildings and structures in Monroe County, Pennsylvania
Tourist attractions in Monroe County, Pennsylvania